Skenea proxima is a species of sea snail, a marine gastropod mollusk in the family Skeneidae.

The name Cyclostrema proxima was introduced by G.W. Tryon as a replacement name for Cyclostrema affine Verrill, 1884 (now recognized as a synonym of Skenea basistriata (Jeffreys, 1877)), while he thought it was closely related to Cyclostrema basistriata Brugnone. Anders Warén thought it would probably prove a synonym of Skenea diaphana. W.H. Dall thought it a synonym of Skenea trochoides.

Description
The size of the shell attains 2.2 mm. The shell is narrowly umbilicated, faintly striate, with a few indistinct spiral lines below the suture, and numerous well defined ones on the base. Around the umbilicus the inferior striae become stronger. The surface of the shell is smooth and greyish white. The suture is impressed. The whorls are very convex and rapidly increasing. The thin periphery is round and  slightly in contact.

Distribution
This species occurs in the Atlantic Ocean off New England and North Carolina, USA, at depths between 538 m and 1542 m.

References

 Verrill, A. E. 1884. Second catalogue of Mollusca recently added to the fauna of the New England coast and the adjacent parts of the Atlantic, consisting mostly of deep-sea species, with notes on others previously recorded. Transactions of the Connecticut Academy of Arts and Sciences 6: 139–294, pls. 28-32

External links
 To Encyclopedia of Life
 To World Register of Marine Species

proxima
Gastropods described in 1888